Mount Lynch is, at , one of the high peaks in the Rampart Ridge, rising between Shupe Peak and Bishop Peak in Victoria Land, Antarctica. It was named by the Advisory Committee on Antarctic Names in 1994 after John Lynch, a National Science Foundation (NSF) representative at the South Pole for a portion of the austral summer season since 1986 and, at the time of naming, Program Manager for Polar Aeronomy and Astrophysics at the Office of Polar Programs, NSF.

References

Mountains of Victoria Land
Scott Coast